Beyramabad (also Romanized as Beyrāmābād and Beyramābād) is a village in Taghenkoh-e Shomali Rural District, Taghenkoh District, Firuzeh County, Razavi Khorasan Province, Iran. At the 2006 census, its population was 277, in 74 families.

See also 

 List of cities, towns and villages in Razavi Khorasan Province

References 

Populated places in Firuzeh County